International Federation of Business and Professional Women (or BPW International) is a worldwide organization committed to networking among and empowering women worldwide. BPW International serves as a forum for professional business women with branches in over 100 countries with a membership of over a quarter of a million, developing the professional, leadership and business potential of women on all levels through advocacy, mentoring and skill building. Their economic empowerment programs and projects around the world promote equal participation of women and men in decision-making roles at all levels. BPW International has consultative status with the United Nations Economic and Social Council (ECOSOC) and participatory status with the Council of Europe.

The International Federation of Business and Professional Women gathers and offers the views of business and professional women to world organizations and agencies. BPW International promotes its objectives without distinction as to ethnicity, race, religion or political beliefs.

According to their website, members of local, regional and national clubs are to take an active role as professional women "in the economy, politics and society." They are to work on behalf of professional women everywhere, especially in the roles of mentoring and lobbying.  The organization has a close relationship with the United Nations as well as other international organizations in their work to advance the role of women. The organization has many publications documenting their work.

History
The International Federation of Business and Professional Women was founded in Geneva, Switzerland, on August 26, 1930, by Dr. Lena Madesin Phillips of Kentucky. As President of the National Federation of Business and Professional Women's Clubs in the United States, Phillips had organized several trips to Europe in 1928 and 1929 to network with business and professional women in Europe. Hundreds of American clubwomen participated in these "Goodwill Tours" and the movement was born. The founding member countries of the BPW International were Austria, Canada, France, Great Britain, Italy and the United States of America. Dr. Phillips was elected as the first president of BPW International and served until 1947.  In 1933 Dr. Phillips served as president of the International Council of Women which was held in conjunction with the Chicago World's Fair.

In 1934, the headquarters moved from Geneva to London, sharing office space at 20 Regent Street with the Electrical Association for Women (EAW). In 1936, British engineer and Director of the EAW Caroline Haslett became vice-president and president in 1950.

See also
 Business and Professional Women's Foundation
 Azra Jafari, national director, Afghanistan
 Yvette Swan, former president
 Esther Afua Ocloo, honoree
 Elisabeth Feller, former president

References

Further reading

External links
 BPW International
 BPW Europe
 BPW Canada
 Business and Professional Women's Foundation

Organizations established in 1930
Women's occupational organizations
Organizations with participatory status with the Council of Europe
International women's organizations